Abderrazak Charik (born 19 September 1997) is a French long-distance runner. In 2020, he competed in the men's race at the 2020 World Athletics Half Marathon Championships held in Gdynia, Poland.

References

External links 
 

Living people
1997 births
Place of birth missing (living people)
French male long-distance runners
21st-century French people